Waverly Senior High School or known just as Waverly High School is located in Waverly, Michigan, an unincorporated community in Delta Township. As of February 2013 the school had 1,060 students in 9th to 12th grade.

In 1963, the Waverly High School would be founded specifically for 10th and 11th graders. And in 1985, freshman would join the High School.

Waverly offers football, basketball, baseball, tennis, hockey, soccer, swimming, girls golf, cheer leading, bowling, and cross country. Students are also able to receive letters for academic achievement while participating in sports.

Notable alumni
Muhsin Muhammad - former National Football League player
John Smoltz - former Major League Baseball player
Danton Cole - former National Hockey League player
 Michael Kimball - American novelist 
 Marcus Taylor- former professional basketball player
 Justin Ingram- (2003) member of 2000 Class A State Championship basketball team, former professional basketball player, current Assistant coach for the Toledo Rockets men's basketball team.

References

External links
 Waverly High School Home Page
Waverly Class of 1969: http://www.CQQL.net/waverly.htm

Public high schools in Michigan
Schools in Eaton County, Michigan
1963 establishments in Michigan
Educational institutions established in 1963